Pong is a district (amphoe) of Phayao province in northern Thailand.

Geography
Neighboring districts are (from the east clockwise) Song Khwae, Tha Wang Pha, Mueang Nan of Nan province, Chiang Muan, Dok Khamtai, Chun and Chiang Kham of Phayao Province.

Doi Phu Nang National Park is in the district.

History
Originally named Mueang Pong, the district was renamed Ban Muang (บ้านม่วง) in 1917. In 1939 it was renamed simply "Pong". In 1952 the district was reassigned to Chiang Rai Province, except sub-district Sa-iap which was split off and added to Song District in Phrae. With the creation of the Province of Phayao in 1977 it was added to the new province.

Administration
The district is divided into seven sub-districts (tambon), which are further subdivided into 88 villages (muban). There are two townships (thesaban tambon) - Pong covers which covers parts of tambon Pong and Na Prang, and Ngim covers parts of tambon Ngim. There are a further seven tambon administrative organization (TAO).

References

External links
amphoe.com

Pong